Hood Glacier is a glacier about  long draining northward from Siege Dome in the Commonwealth Range of Antarctica. It enters the Ross Ice Shelf between the Commonwealth Range and the Separation Range. The glacier was discovered by the Southern Polar Party of the British Antarctic Expedition, 1907–09, under Ernest Shackleton, and was named for Admiral Sir Horace Hood, under whom Jameson Adams, a member of the party, had served in HMS Berwick.

The outcropping known as the Chevron Rocks is located near the head of Hood Glacier.

References

Glaciers of Dufek Coast